The 1922 Texas Mines Miners football team was an American football team that represented the Texas School of Mines (now known as the University of Texas at El Paso) as an independent during the 1922 college football season.  In its first season under head coach Jack C. Vowell, the team compiled a 5–4 record and was outscored by a total of 157 to 102.

Schedule

References

Texas Mines
UTEP Miners football seasons
Texas Mines Miners football